Hammer & Tongs is the pseudonym of British director and producer duo, promo and film director Garth Jennings and producer Nick Goldsmith, as well as the name of their production company. Best known for their work on music videos for Blur ("Coffee & TV") and Supergrass ("Pumping on Your Stereo"), Hammer & Tongs have moved on to directing movies, their debut being the 2005 film version of The Hitchhiker's Guide to the Galaxy. Due to the success of his debut feature Jennings raised £3.5 million to produce Son of Rambow.

After making two feature films and many music videos and adverts, the duo announced in July 2012 that they would be taking an extended break from working together in order to pursue different ventures on their own. In 2016, Jennings wrote and directed the computer-animated musical comedy film Sing.

Music videography

Donna Giles – "And I'm Telling You I'm Not Going" (1994)
The Mutton Birds – "Dominion Road" (1995)
4hero – "Mr. Kirk" (1995)
Skunk Anansie – "Weak" (1996) – dir. Nick Goldsmith
Menswear – "Being Brave" (1996)
Goya Dress – "Crush" (1996)
Sleeper – "Nice Guy Eddie" (1996)
Del Amitri – "Medicine" (1997)
Bentley Rhythm Ace – "Bentley's Gonna Sort You Out!" (1997)
Ash – "A Life Less Ordinary" (1997)
Pulp – "Help the Aged" (1997)
Silver Sun – "Lava" (1997)
Pressure Drop – "Silently Bad Minded" (1998)
Pulp – "A Little Soul" (1998)
Marcy Playground – "Saint Joe on the School Bus" (1998)
Moloko – "The Flipside" (1998)
Eels – "Last Stop: This Town" (1998)
Mansun – "Six" (1999) – dir. Grant Gee
Eels – "Cancer for the Cure" (1999)
Lamb – "B Line" (1999)
Fatboy Slim – "Right Here, Right Now" (1999)
Blur – "Coffee & TV" (1999)
Travis – "Driftwood" (1999)
Supergrass – "Pumping on Your Stereo" (1999)
Moloko – "The Time Is Now" (2000) – dir. Dominic Leung
Coldplay – "Shiver" (2000) – dir. Grant Gee
Bentley Rhythm Ace – "Theme from Gutbuster" (2000)
The Wannadies – "Big Fan" (2000)
Badly Drawn Boy – "Disillusion" (2000)
Shawn Lee – "Happiness" (2000) – dir. Dominic Leung
Fatboy Slim – "Demons" (2000)
R.E.M. – "Imitation of Life" (2001)
Badly Drawn Boy – "Spitting in the Wind" (2001)
Zero 7 – "I Have Seen" (2001)
Capitol K – "Pillow" (2002) – dir. Dominic Leung
Badly Drawn Boy – "Silent Sigh" (2002)
Badly Drawn Boy – "Something to Talk About" (2002)
Beck – "Lost Cause" (2003)
Supergrass – "Low C" (2005)
Beck – "Hell Yes" (2005)
Hot Chip – "Boy from School" (2006)
Vampire Weekend – "A-Punk" (2008)
Vampire Weekend – "Cousins" (2009)

References

External links
Hammer & Tongs – "fine foods and film since 1994" (Official site)

Hammer and Tongs 2000 interview
Time Out Son of Rambow Preview
Culture Café (French) – Son of Rambow preview – 2007 production for Hammer & Tongs and director Garth Jennings
Boys in the mud (Guardian article)
EyeForFilm.co.uk – Interview with Garth Jennings about Son of Rambow and plans for an animated feature film.
 Garth Jenning's Guest DJ Set on KCRW KCRW Guest DJ Set
Videos by Garth Jennings

Film production companies of the United Kingdom
British film producers
British film directors
English music video directors
Advertising directors